Tommi Hakala (born 9 August 1970) is a Finnish operatic baritone and winner of the 2003 BBC Singer of the World Competition in Cardiff.  He was born in Riihimäki, Finland.

Sources
BBC News, "Finnish flourish for song contest", 30 June 2003
BBC Singer of the World Competition, Biography: Tommi Hakala

1970 births
Living people
People from Riihimäki
21st-century Finnish male opera singers